is a mountain range in northeastern Honshu, in the Tōhoku region of northern Japan. The range is largely an eroded plateau with a thick granite bedrock, thus accounting for its other name: . In the north, the mountains are characterized by marine terraces at an altitude of around 300 meters, whereas in the south, the mountains are drowned to form a deeply indented rias coast.

Geologically, the Kitakami Mountains are Paleozoic and Mesozoic formations, divided into northern and southern groups. the southern area has oldest previous Silurian foundation, which was once a shallow sea on the continental margin where the water temperature was high enough for coral growth from the Silurian to the Devonian periods; this region, later collided with the northern Kitakami mountainous area in the early Cretaceous period, and the whole was penetrated by the granite in various places. Until the Paleogene, the Kitakami Mountains were geologically  part of Primorsky region of Siberia. About 30 million years to 15 million years ago, the Japanese archipelago separated from the continent and moved to its present position. The Kitakami Mountains around that time was an island, the west side was a shallow sea, and the Ōu Mountains were not yet born. The uplift of the Ōu mountain range began in late Miocene and the Kitakami Basin was born. The Kitakami Mountains were exposed to erosion for a long time because they were above water from the Cenozoic onwards. In addition, as a result the glacier effects of the last glacial period, the current gentle topography was created.

Notable caves within the Kitakami Mountains include Akkadō and Ryūsendō.

The peaks of the Kitakami mountains include the following:

Mount Hayachine (早池峰山) 1917 m
Hashigamidake (階上岳) 739.6 m
Akkamori (安家森) 1239 m
Kuromoriyama (黒森山) 837 m
Goyozan (五葉山)1351 m
Muroneyama (室根山) 895 m
Omoriyama (大森山) 750 m
Tokusenjosan (徳仙丈山) 711 m
Tatsuganesan (田束山) 512 m

References

Notes

Mountain ranges of Aomori Prefecture
Mountain ranges of Iwate Prefecture
Mountain ranges of Miyagi Prefecture